The Lost World of Communism is a three-part British documentary series which examines the legacy of communism twenty years on from the fall of the Berlin Wall. Produced by Peter Molloy and Lucy Hetherington, the series takes a retrospective look at life behind the Iron Curtain between 1945 and 1989, focusing on three countries in the Eastern Bloc - East Germany, Czechoslovakia and Romania. Through film and television footage and the personal recollections of those who lived in these countries, the series offers a glimpse of what daily life was like during the years of Communist rule.

The Lost World of Communism debuted on BBC Two on Saturday 14 March 2009 at 9:00pm. There is also a book which accompanies the series.

Episode list

References

External links
 

2000s British documentary television series
2009 British television series debuts
2009 British television series endings
British television miniseries
English-language television shows
BBC television documentaries about history during the 20th Century